Dogoso may refer to:

Dogoso language, a Gur language of Burkina Faso

Dɔgɔsɔ, a dialect of Escarpment Dogon (a language of Mali)

See also
Doghose language, a Gur language of Burkina Faso